Basil Williams is the name of:

 Basil Williams (cricketer) (1949–2015), former West Indian cricketer
 Basil Williams (figure skater) (1891–1951), British single skater and pair skater
 Basil Williams (historian) (1867–1950), English historian

See also 
 List of people with surname Williams